Hradové Střímelice is a village and administrative part of Stříbrná Skalice in the Central Bohemian Region of the Czech Republic.

The area of Hradová Střimelice is 4.89 km².

History
The first written mention of Hradové Střímelice is from 1320.

Landmarks
 Defunct castle Hradové Střimelice from the 14th century on the northeastern edge of the village.

References

External links

Information about castle in Hradové Střimelice on Hrady.cz
Unofficial website of Hradové Střimelice

Neighbourhoods in the Czech Republic
Populated places in Prague-East District